Mary Ann Ansell, a housemaid, was hanged at St Albans Prison, England on 19 July 1899, for poisoning her sister Caroline, who was an inmate in an asylum. Her motive was asserted to be to obtain £11.5s from a life insurance policy which she had taken out on Caroline.

At 18 or 22 years old (reports differ), she was the youngest woman to be hanged in the UK in the 'modern era' (after the 1868 reform act, so non-public, and also by the 'long drop' method).

Before Ansell's execution, there was considerable public pressure for a reprieve, on the grounds of her sex, youth, and perceived lack of mental capacity (both of herself, and of other members of her family). The Metropolitan Asylums Board passed a resolution calling for clemency. Some newspapers, including the Daily Mail under the headline "A One-sided Investigation", asked for a reprieve. Three questions were asked in the House of Commons in relation to her case, and more than 100 MPs signed a petition that her life be spared. However, the Home Office was unwilling to reprieve a poisoner, this murder being considered a premeditated act, and poisoning an especially heinous crime under English law.

In 1900, her case was cited in an academic study of the limits to criminal responsibility.

References 

1899 deaths
19th-century executions by England and Wales
Executed English women
Poisoners
Murderers for life insurance money
British female murderers
People convicted of murder by England and Wales
English people convicted of murder
Executed people from London
Sororicides
1899 murders in the United Kingdom